Las Sinsombrero (Spanish for "hatless women") were a group of female thinkers and artists in the Generation of '27.

In 2015 they had a movie based on them, which included people like Maruja Mallo and Concha Mendez.

Famous members 

 Maruja Mallo (1902-1995), painter
 Rosario de Velasco (1904-1991), painter
 Margarita Gil Roësset (1908-1932), sculptor
 María Zambrano (1904-1991), philosopher
 María Teresa León (1903-1988), journalist
 Josefina de la Torre (1907-2002), poetess
 Rosa Chacel (1898-1994), journalist and novelist
 Ernestina de Champourcín (1905-1999), poetess
 Concha Méndez (1898-1986), poetess
 Margarita Manso (1908-1960), painter
 Delhy Tejero (1904- 1968), painter
 Ángeles Santos Torroella (1911-2013), painter
 Concha de Albornoz (1900-1972), feminist writer
 Luisa Carnés (1905-1964), journalist and writer

References

Generation of '27
Spanish feminists
Feminism in Spain
European feminists
Sinsombrero
Women's rights in Spain